Nick Ramm is an English, London-based, pianist and composer.

In 2005, he released his first album, Flashes of a Normal World, with his own band Clown Revisited. The bands he has been involved with in include The Cinematic Orchestra, Finn Peters' Finntet, Fulborn Teversham and the BBC Big Band.

Discography 
 Clown Revisited (2006, F-IRE Collective)
 Off The Cut (2006, w/Zhenya Strigalev)
 Ma Fleur by The Cinematic Orchestra (2007, Ninja Tune)
 Touchy by Clare Hirst (2008)
 Live at the Royal Albert Hall by The Cinematic Orchestra (2008, Ninja Tune)
 London Brew (2023, as part of London Brew)

References

External links

Living people
English jazz pianists
21st-century pianists
Year of birth missing (living people)